Nan Shan Power Center is a shopping center in Zhonghe District, New Taipei, Taiwan that opened in 2003. Owned and operated by Nan Shan Life Insurance Company, Ltd., it is the first and largest shopping mall in the district. The main core stores of the mall include Carrefour, Tsannkuen and various themed restaurants. The mall is located in close proximity to Zhonghe metro station.

Floor guide

Gallery

See also
 List of tourist attractions in Taiwan

References

External links

2003 establishments in Taiwan
Shopping malls in New Taipei
Shopping malls established in 2003